Sunny Sue Johnson (September 21, 1953 – June 19, 1984) was an American actress. She played figure skater Jeanie in the 1983 film Flashdance.

Johnson died from brain hemorrhage at the age of 30.

Career
Johnson first appeared in the television series Baretta. She also appeared in an episode of Charlie's Angels. She also had roles in the films The Night the Lights Went Out in Georgia and the spoof Dr. Heckyl and Mr. Hype with the English actor Oliver Reed. She appears briefly in the film Animal House as Fawn Liebowitz's sorority housemate at the girl's college during the road trip sequence, and is listed in the film's credits as 'Otter's Co-ed'.

Death
On the night of June 18, 1984, Johnson was found unconscious in the home she shared with her boyfriend, Archie Hahn. She was taken to UCLA Medical Center, where doctors discovered that she had suffered a brain hemorrhage. She remained on life support until the following day when she was declared clinically dead. Without any hope of her mental recovery, her family agreed to take her off of life support.  Johnson was 30 years old.

Filmography

References

External links
 

1953 births
1984 deaths
20th-century American actresses
American film actresses
American television actresses
Actresses from Bakersfield, California